Zhaleh Kazemi (née Zahra Kazemi-Azad; 3 April 1943 – 31 March 2004) was an Iranian television producer, news anchor, and painter. She was also a voice actress for Persian-dubbed films in Iranian cinema.

Her dubbing work was done for many American films, and Kazemi was the regular voice actor for films starring Sophia Loren, Elizabeth Taylor, and Ingrid Bergman. Other actresses she dubbed for included Vivien Leigh, Eva Gardner, Jennifer Jones, Joanne Woodward, Leslie Caron, Shirley MacLaine, Vanessa Redgrave, Ali MacGraw, Julie Christie, Faye Dunaway, Barbra Streisand, and Mia Farrow. After the Iranian Revolution in 1979, the film dubbing industry in Iran stopped.

See also
 Iranian art
 List of Iranian artists

References

External links 
 
 

Iranian women painters
1943 births
2004 deaths
20th-century Iranian painters
20th-century Iranian women artists
Iranian voice actresses
Iranian radio and television presenters